Anam can be a given name or a surname. It is of Arabic origin and it means "blessed" .

The following are people with the name "Anam":

Given Name
Anam Amin (born 1992), Pakistani cricketer
Anam Hashim, Indian motorcycle stunt performer and rider
Anam Kazim (born 1986), Canadian politician
Anam Tanveer, Pakistani model and actress
Anam Goher, Pakistani actress
Anam Fayyaz, Pakistani television actress

Surname
Anam Vivekananda Reddy, Indian politician
Khalid Anam, Pakistani actor
Mahfuz Anam (born 1950), Bangladeshi editor and publisher 
Shantanu Anam (born 1990), Indian writer and actor
Stacy (singer), Malaysian singer born as Stracie Angie Anam
Tahmima Anam (born 1975), British-Bangladeshi writer, novelist and columnist
Tariq Anam Khan (born 1953), Bangladeshi actor, director, writer and producer

See also
Inaam